The Public Administration and Constitutional Affairs Select Committee, formerly the Public Administration Select Committee, is a select committee appointed by the British House of Commons to examine the reports of the Parliamentary and Health Service Ombudsman, and to consider matters relating to the quality and standards of administration provided by civil service departments, and other matters relating to the civil service, mostly for England and Wales, and constitutional affairs.

It is the principal select committee to which Cabinet Office ministers are accountable and thus handles pre appointment and accountability hearings for independent officers, with an independent civil society or cross departmental role, such as the First Civil Service Commissioner, the chair of the UK Statistics Authority and the chair of the Charity Commission.

The committee chooses its own subjects of inquiry, within its overall terms of reference; however, it seeks evidence from a wide variety of individuals and groups with relevant interests and experience. The members of the committee are drawn from the three largest political parties, and the committee itself mainly publishes its results through reports and making its recommendations known to the government.

Membership
The members of the select committee are:

Changes 2019-present

2017–2019 Parliament
The election of the chair took place on 12 July 2017, with the members of the committee being announced on 11 September 2017.

Changes 2017-2019

2015–2017 Parliament
The election of the chair took place on 18 June 2015, with the members of the committee being announced on 6 July 2015.

Changes 2015-2017

2010-2015 Parliament
The election of the chair took place on 10 June 2010, with the members of the committee being announced on 12 July 2010.

Changes 2010-2015

Reports
A March 2004 report considered the prerogative powers of Ministers.

A major report published in July 2011 addressed procurement of Information Technology by the government and found there was an over-reliance "on a small 'oligopoly' of large suppliers", which some witnesses before the Committee had described as a 'cartel'. An independent comment given prominence in the report described the UK as "a world leader in ineffective IT schemes for government". The Office of Fair Trading investigated but did not find sufficient evidence either to confirm that suppliers had been acting in breach of competition law, or to exonerate them. The government welcomed "the Committee's interest in and support for government Information and Communication Technology" and in response noted in particular that the government was "in the process of breaking the contractual lock-in which places the majority of ICT business with a small group of major systems integrators", and "working to improve the quality of its ICT management information".

Reports published in 2021 include The role and status of the Prime Minister’s Office, published in June 2021.

In 2022 the committee reported on government ethics.  Committee chair William Wragg stated a "robust" system was needed to uphold standards "with proper sanctions for those who break the rules".  The committee was also concerned the government maintained its coming ethics adviser would not look into what happened round Suella Braverman's resignation.  MP's on the committee stated the government should not be able to decide what the adviser, not yet appointed, could investigate.  In its report, the committee also stated there should be legal action against former ministers who broke rules through taking certain jobs after leaving officed.  Former ministers should look for advice from the Advisory Committee on Business Appointments but ministers cannot be made to accept this committee's advice.  The record of the current government was strongly criticised.  The committee want the ethics adviser to be able to carry out inquiries into historical behaviour.

See also
List of Committees of the United Kingdom Parliament

References

External links
 Public Administration Select Committee page on UK Parliament website
 Records for this Committee are held at the Parliamentary Archives

Westminster system
Select Committees of the British House of Commons